Max Wilbur Noah (February 19, 1932 – June 15, 2018) was a lieutenant general in the United States Army. He served as Comptroller of the United States Army from 1984 to 1988 and Commander of the United States Army Engineer School from 1980 to 1982.

Noah was born in Greensboro, North Carolina and raised in Georgia. He graduated from the Georgia Military College high school in 1948 and then studied engineering at Georgia Tech for a year before being appointed to the United States Military Academy. Noah graduated from West Point with a B.S. degree in 1953 and was commissioned in the Army Corps of Engineers. He served as a platoon leader with the 74th Engineer Battalion, 3rd Infantry Division in Korea.

In 1958, Noah earned an M.S.E. degree in electrical engineering from Purdue University. He then taught electrical engineering and nuclear physics at West Point until 1962. Noah graduated from the Command and General Staff College in 1965 and the Army War College in 1970.

After retiring from the Army on June 30, 1988, Noah settled in Alexandria, Virginia. He died at Fort Belvoir, Virginia and was buried at the West Point Cemetery on September 27, 2018.

References

1932 births
2018 deaths
People from Greensboro, North Carolina
Georgia Tech alumni
United States Military Academy alumni
United States Army Corps of Engineers personnel
United States Army personnel of the Korean War
Purdue University College of Engineering alumni
United States Military Academy faculty
United States Army Command and General Staff College alumni
United States Army personnel of the Vietnam War
Recipients of the Air Medal
United States Army War College alumni
Recipients of the Meritorious Service Medal (United States)
Recipients of the Legion of Merit
United States Army generals
Recipients of the Distinguished Service Medal (US Army)
People from Alexandria, Virginia
Burials at West Point Cemetery